Station Casino Reno is a proposed hotel and casino located at the intersection of Kietzke Lane and South Virginia Street next to the Reno-Sparks Convention Center in Reno, Nevada.

The building design is similar to Aliante (formerly known as Aliante Station), Green Valley Ranch and Red Rock Resort.

References

External links
  (archive)

Casinos in Reno, Nevada
Hotels in Reno, Nevada
Station Casinos